"Summer Days" is a song by Dutch producer Martin Garrix, featuring American rapper Macklemore and singer Patrick Stump of Fall Out Boy. The song was released on 25 April 2019. The music video for the song was released on 22 May 2019.

Background
On 20 April 2019, Garrix, Macklemore and Stump all simultaneously shared a picture with the caption "I got this feeling on a Summer day" on their social media. The collaboration was officially confirmed by Garrix two days later. Garrix teased the release by posting a snippet of the song. Kat Bein of Billboard described the collaboration as "a cross-genre-sing-along".

Charts

Weekly charts

Year-end charts

Certifications

References

2019 songs
2019 singles
Martin Garrix songs
Macklemore songs
Stmpd Rcrds singles
Songs written by Martin Garrix
Songs written by Macklemore
Songs written by Brian Lee (songwriter)